John Henry Jones Jr. (born March 30, 1961) is an American college basketball coach who is the head coach of the Texas Southern Tigers basketball team. He was formerly the men's basketball head coach at North Texas and at his alma mater LSU.

Playing career
Jones played in the 1981 Final Four as a freshman at LSU, and later served 12 seasons as an assistant coach at LSU under Dale Brown where the pair returned to the 1986 Final Four.

Coaching career

Head coaching career

Memphis
Jones was named interim head coach at the University of Memphis just prior to the 1999–2000 season, replacing Tic Price. He coached the team to a 15–16 record.

North Texas
During Jones' stint at North Texas, he coached the Mean Green to five-straight 20-win seasons from 2007–11, and two Sun Belt tournament championships and NCAA tournament bids. Under Jones, North Texas was just the third program to advance to three consecutive Sun Belt Tournament championship games.

LSU
At LSU, Jones compiled a 90–72 (.556) overall record with a 42–48 (.467) SEC record in 5 seasons. He led LSU to one NCAA tournament berth during the 2014–15 season, losing to N.C. State in the opening round, and one NIT  berth in 2013–14. Jones' team was invited to participate in the NIT in the 2016 season but the University stepped in and declined the offer.

Texas Southern
Jones was named head basketball coach at Texas Southern on June 27, 2018.

Head coaching record

NCAA tournament

NIT tournament

CIT tournament

Personal life
Jones' son, John, is a college basketball player. He played as a walk-on for the Nevada Wolf Pack under his father during the 2017–18 season and transferred to the Texas Southern Tigers when his father was hired as head coach in 2018.

References

External links
 LSU Tigers bio

1961 births
Living people
Alabama Crimson Tide men's basketball coaches
American men's basketball coaches
American men's basketball players
Basketball coaches from Louisiana
Basketball players from Louisiana
College men's basketball head coaches in the United States
LSU Tigers basketball coaches
LSU Tigers basketball players
Memphis Tigers men's basketball coaches
North Texas Mean Green men's basketball coaches
Texas Southern Tigers men's basketball coaches
Place of birth missing (living people)
People from DeRidder, Louisiana